James Darcy, 1st Baron Darcy of Navan (c. 1650 – 19 July 1731) was a British Tory politician and peer.

He was the son of James Darcy, son of Conyers Darcy, 7th Baron Darcy de Knayth, and Isabel Wyvill. He served in the House of Commons of England as the Member of Parliament for Richmond between 1698 and 1701. He was re-elected to sit for the seat from 1702 to 1705. On 13 September 1721 he was created Baron Darcy of Navan in the Peerage of Ireland. The title was created with special remainder to male heirs of his daughter, Mary.

He was married four times, but had no male issue. His daughter Mary married William Jessop. He was succeeded in his title by the terms of the remainder by his grandson, James Jessop, who subsequently changed his surname to Darcy.

References

Year of birth unknown
1731 deaths
Barons in the Peerage of Ireland
Peers of Ireland created by George I
English MPs 1698–1700
English MPs 1701
English MPs 1702–1705
Tory MPs (pre-1834)
Year of birth uncertain